George King "Smiler" Murray (September 23, 1898 – October 18, 1955) was a baseball pitcher for the New York Yankees, Boston Red Sox, Washington Senators, and Chicago White Sox.

Biography
Murray was born on September 23, 1898, in Charlotte, North Carolina.

He attended to North Carolina State College, where he played college baseball for the Wolfpack.  In , when he was 23, he broke into the Major Leagues on May 8 with the New York Yankees. He was mainly a relief pitcher, although started two games (out of 22 pitched in all). He was 4-2 with a 3.97 ERA.

The next two years Murray spent with the Boston Red Sox On January 30, 1923, Murray was traded to the Red Sox with Camp Skinner and Norm McMillan for star pitcher Herb Pennock and $50,000. In , nearly half of the games he pitched in he started; however, he did worse than he did the year before, going 7-11 with a 4.91 earned run average. His seven wins that season were a career high, though.

In 1924, Murray went back to mainly relief pitching, and did even worse than he did the previous two years. He finished with a record of 2-9 and an earned run average of 6.72; he had one of the worst seasons out of all of the pitchers on the team.

That was the final year he played with the Red Sox. He was converted to a starting pitcher, didn't pitch as much, but still had the second best season of his career (behind his rookie season). He finished at 6-3 with a mediocre 5.63 ERA. In twelve games pitched he only gave up one home run, very good for a pitcher.

Murray pitched 1927 with the Senators as well. His amount of pitching time continued to decline, and it turned out that 1926 was his final season as a starting pitcher; 1927 was spent as a little-used relief man.

Murray did not pitch at all for the next five years. He made a comeback with the Chicago White Sox in 1933, but only pitched two games. His final game was played May 1 of that year, and at age 34, that marked the end of his Major League career.

Murray died on October 18, 1955, in Memphis, Tennessee. He was buried in Brownsville, Tennessee.

References

1898 births
1955 deaths
New York Yankees players
Boston Red Sox players
Washington Senators (1901–1960) players
Chicago White Sox players
Major League Baseball pitchers
Baseball players from North Carolina
Rochester Colts players
Mobile Bears players
Kansas City Blues (baseball) players
Dallas Steers players
Minneapolis Millers (baseball) players
Birmingham Barons players
Oklahoma City Indians players
Rochester Red Wings players
Toronto Maple Leafs (International League) players
Sacramento Solons players
Savannah Indians players
Winston-Salem Twins players
Spartanburg Spartans players
NC State Wolfpack baseball players